Acrocercops cocciferellum is a moth of the family Gracillariidae. It is known from France, Spain and Tunisia.

The larvae feed on Quercus coccifera. They mine the leaves of their host plant. The mine has the form of a blotch mine on underside of the leaf.

References

cocciferellum
Moths of Europe
Moths described in 1910